Guilday is a surname. Notable people with the surname include:
 Peter Guilday (born 1884), American Catholic priest
 Rory Guilday (born 2002), American ice hockey player